Sophie Frances Monique Devine (born 1 September 1989) is a New Zealand sportswoman, who has represented New Zealand in both cricket for the New Zealand national women's cricket team (White Ferns), and in field hockey as a member of the New Zealand women's national field hockey team (Black Sticks Women). She has since focused on cricket. She is known for not wearing a helmet when batting, a rarity in 21st century cricket. In December 2017, she was named as one of the players in the ICC Women's T20I Team of the Year.

In August 2018, she was awarded a central contract by New Zealand Cricket, following the tours of Ireland and England in the previous months. In October 2018, she was named in New Zealand's squad for the 2018 ICC Women's World Twenty20 tournament in the West Indies. Ahead of the tournament, she was named as the star of the team.

In July 2020, Devine was appointed as the captain of the New Zealand women's cricket team on a full-time basis, taking over from Amy Satterthwaite. In September 2021, in the second match against England, Devine played in her 100th WT20I.

Early life
Devine was born in Kenepuru hospital, Porirua, New Zealand, and grew up in Tawa, a northern suburb of Wellington, New Zealand, where she attended Greenacres School and Tawa College. She began to play cricket and hockey at the age of four and wanted to become an All Black. At Tawa College, she played cricket mainly in the boys' teams including representative Wellington age group teams and the Tawa College boys first 11 and she played in the boys premier hockey team for the Tawa club. In her last year at Tawa College, she was awarded the bowling 'wicket' for the most wickets in the season. A previous winner was Black Caps Mark Gillespie. She started playing Senior women's hockey at age 14 and made her first-class cricket debut as a 14-year-old. At the end of 2006, Devine shifted to Christchurch with her family when her father was relocated with his work. After attending Rangi Ruru Girls' School for her final high school year she attended the University of Canterbury completing a Bachelor of Arts majoring in Sociology.

Career

Devine was selected for the New Zealand women's national cricket team, the White Ferns, at age 17 and became one of the youngest-ever members of the team. She was in a home economics class at Tawa College when the White Ferns coach, Steve Jenkin, gave her the news.

In November 2018, she was named in the Adelaide Strikers' squad for the 2018–19 Women's Big Bash League season. In March 2019, she was named as the ANZ International Women's T20 Player of the Year at the annual New Zealand Cricket awards. She also took over as captain as Amy Satterthwaite went on maternity leave.

In January 2020, she was named as the captain of New Zealand's squad for the 2020 ICC Women's T20 World Cup in Australia. On 10 February 2020, in the fourth WT20I match against South Africa, Devine scored her first century in a WT20I match. In the same match, she became the first cricketer (male or female) to make five consecutive scores of fifty or more in T20Is. In New Zealand's first match of the Women's T20 World Cup, against Sri Lanka, Devine became the first cricketer, male or female, to make six consecutive scores of fifty or more in T20I cricket. She was the leading run-scorer for New Zealand in the tournament, with 132 runs in four matches.

In November 2020, Devine was nominated for the ICC Women's T20I Cricketer of the Decade award. In February 2022, she was named as the captain of New Zealand's team for the 2022 Women's Cricket World Cup in New Zealand.

In April 2022, she was picked by the Birmingham Phoenix for the 2022 season of The Hundred in England. In June 2022, Devine was named as the captain of New Zealand's team for the cricket tournament at the 2022 Commonwealth Games in Birmingham, England.

In the inaugural season of the Women's Premier League in 2023, Devine was bought by Royal Challengers Bangalore (RCB) at the price of 50 Lakhs.

Records
On 11 July 2015, Devine broke the international record (women) for the fastest Twenty20 half century (from 18 balls), and fastest 70 runs (from 22 balls), and included scoring 32 off one over in the first match against India. She holds the record for scoring the fastest ever fifty in Women's Twenty20 International (WT20I) history (from 18 balls). During a match against Pakistan at the 2017 Women's Cricket World Cup, Devine became the first woman to hit nine sixes in Women's One-day International cricket. In 2020, she became the first player (male or female) to score fifties in 6 consecutive T20Is. In January 2021, she broke the women's T20 record for the fastest century, scoring 100 in 36 balls for Wellington Blaze against Otago Sparks in the 2020–21 Super Smash.

International centuries

One Day International centuries

T20 International centuries

References

Further reading

External links

 
 

1989 births
Living people
New Zealand cricketers
New Zealand women Twenty20 International cricketers
New Zealand female field hockey players
New Zealand women cricketers
People educated at Tawa College
New Zealand women One Day International cricketers
Wellington Blaze cricketers
Canterbury Magicians cricketers
South Australian Scorpions cricketers
Adelaide Strikers (WBBL) cricketers
Loughborough Lightning cricketers
Warwickshire women cricketers
Yorkshire Diamonds cricketers
Western Australia women cricketers
Perth Scorchers (WBBL) cricketers
IPL Supernovas cricketers
Royal Challengers Bangalore (WPL) cricketers
Cricketers at the 2022 Commonwealth Games
Commonwealth Games bronze medallists for New Zealand
Commonwealth Games medallists in cricket
Birmingham Phoenix cricketers
New Zealand expatriate sportspeople in England
New Zealand expatriate sportspeople in Australia
21st-century New Zealand women
Medallists at the 2022 Commonwealth Games